Amawar is a village in Pindra Tehsil of Varanasi district in the Indian state of Uttar Pradesh. Amawar falls under Mohanpur gram panchayat. The village is about 15 kilometers North-West of Varanasi city, 277 kilometers South-East of state capital Lucknow and 802 kilometers South-East of the national capital Delhi.

Demography
Amawar has a total population of 444 people amongst 70 families. Sex ratio of Amawar is 922 and child sex ratio is 600. Uttar Pradesh state average for both ratios is 912 and 902 respectively .

Transportation
Amawar can be accessed by road and does not have a railway station of its own. Closest railway station to this village is Birapatti railway station (1.2 kilometers North). Nearest operational airports are Varanasi airport (12 kilometers North-West) and Allahabad Airports (141 kilometers West).

See also

Pindra Tehsil
Pindra (Assembly constituency)

Notes
  All demographic data is based on 2011 Census of India.

References 

Villages in Varanasi district